Hall O'Meagher (born 27 January 1974) is a former cricketer who played List A cricket for the ACT Comets in the Mercantile Mutual Cup.

O'Meagher, a spin bowler, played his club cricket for the ANU.

He featured in all one day matches for the Comets in both the 1997/98 and 1998/99 domestic seasons, a total of 12 overall, for 10 wickets. In a match against Western Australia at Manuka Oval in 1999 he took the wickets of both Justin Langer and Simon Katich.

References

External links

1974 births
Living people
Australian cricketers
ACT Comets cricketers
Cricketers from the Australian Capital Territory